The Portland Gas & Coke Building, also known as the Gas and Coke Building and Gasco Building, was an administrative building located in northwest Portland, Oregon, United States. It was constructed by Portland Gas & Coke in 1913 as part of a manufacturing plant, in which the company coked gas and fuel from coal. The building was vacated in 1957 due to contamination issues, and demolition of the building began on September 12, 2015, with the demolition project completing in November 2015.

Description
The Portland Gas & Coke Building was an administrative building located along U.S. Route 30, just south of the St. Johns Bridge in Portland's Northwest Industrial neighborhood. It exhibits Gothic architectural style.

History
The building was constructed by Portland Gas & Coke (now known as NW Natural, formerly Northwest Natural Gas Company) in 1913 as part of a plant to manufacture gas from oil. With the arrival of natural gas in the 1950s, the company shut down the plant, which has been vacant since 1958. The administrative building was the plant's longest-remaining structure. It was listed on Portland's Historic Resource Inventory until NW Natural's removal request in August 2012. The company announced removal plans in December 2013 due to a "federally mandated cleanup effort in the area". NW Natural outlined the following concerns with the structure on their website:

Demolition
A community group called Save the Portland GasCo Building attempted to raise $2 million to preserve the building, but their efforts were unsuccessful and resulted in only $4,000 from T-shirt sales. After learning of NW Natural's plans to proceed with the demolition, the historical preservation group's leader made plans to rally supporters at Skyline Tavern and said, "Portland is moving so fast these days—we're ripping out old Portland, and this is one of the last icons. This would be a relic that points to Portland's past. We call it an industrial cathedral." The group also confirmed plans to fly drones over the building to record footage for preservation and to stream video of its demolition via a 24/7 "GASCO cam". Architecture critic Brian Libby said of the building's demolition, "Shame on them, and shame on all of us."

NW Natural began demolishing the building in September 2015; the process began with four to five weeks of stripping the interior before tearing down the exterior. According to the company, many people submitted requests to photograph the building. Requests were declined due to the building's dilapidated state, but NW Natural displays professional photographs of the structure on their website. The demolition was completed in November 2015.

In popular culture
The Gas & Coke Building is featured on the cover of Colin Meloy's 2012 novel, Under Wildwood. Meloy was also a supporter of the preservation efforts for the building.

References

1913 establishments in Oregon
2015 disestablishments in Oregon
Buildings and structures demolished in 2015
Commercial buildings completed in 1913
Demolished buildings and structures in Portland, Oregon
Gothic Revival architecture in Oregon
Northwest Portland, Oregon